Shawnee High School is a public high school near Springfield, Ohio.  It is the only high school in the Clark-Shawnee Local School District.  The high school offers college preparatory classes along with many different programs in sports, band, drama, foreign languages, and music.  Students and alumni are known as "The Shawnee Braves."  The high school campus is located on East Possum Road in Springfield, Ohio.  Springfield is located about 50 miles west of Columbus, Ohio, and about 35 miles east of Dayton, Ohio. The schools that generally feed into Shawnee include Possum, Reid, and Rockway Elementary and Middle Schools in Clark County.

Ohio High School Athletic Association State Championships
 Girls Track and Field – 1992
 Boys Cross Country - 2011
 Football - 2011 (State Runners-Up, Division III)

Notable alumni
 Kevin Donley, college football head coach
Michelle Gorelow (Phelps), politician
Elle Smith, model, journalist, and Miss USA 2021

References

External links
 District Website

High schools in Clark County, Ohio
Public high schools in Ohio